Zagreus Ridge (‘Hrebet Zagrey’ \'hre-bet za-'grey\) is the partly ice-free ridge extending 10 km and 3.8 km wide, rising to 1061 m (Marchaevo Peak) on Oscar II Coast in Graham Land.  It descends from Forbidden Plateau southeastwards between Hektoria Glacier and Paspal Glacier.  The feature is named after the Thracian god Zagreus.

Location
British mapping in 1978.

Maps
 British Antarctic Territory.  Scale 1:200000 topographic map.  DOS 610 Series, Sheet W 64 60.  Directorate of Overseas Surveys, Tolworth, UK, 1978.
Antarctic Digital Database (ADD). Scale 1:250000 topographic map of Antarctica. Scientific Committee on Antarctic Research (SCAR). Since 1993, regularly upgraded and updated.

References
 Zagreus Ridge. SCAR Composite Antarctic Gazetteer.
 Bulgarian Antarctic Gazetteer. Antarctic Place-names Commission. (details in Bulgarian, basic data in English)

External links
 Zagreus Ridge. Copernix satellite image

Ridges of Graham Land
Oscar II Coast
Bulgaria and the Antarctic